Frostingen is a local online and print newspaper in published in Frosta, Norway.

History and profile
Frostingen was founded in 1919. It covers the municipality of Frosta and the area of Åsen in Levanger and is published in tabloid format. The newspaper is independently owned. It has one weekly issue, on Thursdays.

In 2013 Frostingen had a circulation of 1,422 copies.

References

External links
 Official website

1919 establishments in Norway
Newspapers established in 1919
Weekly newspapers published in Norway
Norwegian-language newspapers
Frosta
Mass media in Trøndelag